Mira Herfort Wanting (19 April 1978 – 22 December 2012) was a Danish actress. She appeared in TV3's series Hvide løgne in 1998, and played Gitte in Anja and Viktor (2001) and its three sequels. She died on 22 December 2012 as a result of cervical cancer.

Filmography

Film

Television

References

External links
 

1978 births
2012 deaths
Danish film actresses
Danish television actresses
Danish stage actresses
Deaths from cancer in Denmark
Deaths from cervical cancer